Michael Jemtrud is a McGill University associate professor of Architecture (in Montreal, Canada), and former Director of the School of Architecture (2007-2011).

Education
Jemtrud received a B.A. in Philosophy and a professional Bachelor of Architecture degree from Pennsylvania State University. He also holds a master's degree in History and Theory of Architecture from McGill University.

References

Year of birth missing (living people)
Living people
Penn State College of Arts and Architecture alumni
Academic staff of McGill University
Academic staff of Carleton University
McGill School of Architecture alumni